Francis Hugh Bacon (24 June 1869 – 31 October 1915) was an English first-class cricketer. He was a right-handed batsman and a right-arm slow bowler.

Career
Bacon first played for Hampshire in 1894, the season in which the county club regained its first-class status, although Bacon made no first-class appearances for the county that season. The following season Bacon made his first-class debut for Hampshire against Somerset.

Bacon played 75 first-class matches for Hampshire, with the 1903 season being his most successful 357 runs at a batting average of 18.78, with a high score of 39*. In terms of batting average, the 1906 season was Bacon's best with 308 runs at a batting average of 23.69, with three fifties and a high score of 60.

Bacon's final match for Hampshire came in the 1911 County Championship against Lancashire at Old Trafford in Manchester. In Bacon's 75 first-class matches for the county he scored 1,909 runs at a batting average of 15.77, with five half centuries and a single century which gave Bacon his highest score of 110 against Leicestershire in 1907. Bacon also took 6 wickets at a bowling average of 31.66, with best figures of 2/23. 	

Bacon was also a scorer in four Hampshire v Warwickshire matches in 1911, 1912, 1913 and 1914.

World War I service and death
Bacon died at sea off the coast of Belgium aboard the Royal Yacht Squadron's steam yacht Aries. The ship was  mined by  while on an Auxiliary Patrol near the South Goodwin Lightship on 31 October 1915. Bacon, serving as an Assistant Paymaster, died in the sinking, along with 21 others on board.

References

External links
Francis Bacon at Cricinfo
Francis Bacon at CricketArchive
Matches and detailed statistics for Francis Bacon

1869 births
1915 deaths
Cricketers from Colombo
People from British Ceylon
English cricketers
Hampshire cricketers
Cricket scorers
English cricket administrators
Royal Navy sailors
Royal Navy personnel of World War I
British military personnel killed in World War I
English people of Sri Lankan descent
Deaths due to shipwreck at sea